Balraj Pasi is an Indian politician.  He was elected to the Lok Sabha, the lower house of the Parliament of India from the Nainital constituency of Uttar Pradesh (now Uttarakhand) as a member of the Bharatiya Janata Party.

References

External links
 Official Biographical Sketch in Lok Sabha Website

1960 births
Living people
Bharatiya Janata Party politicians from Uttarakhand
People from Nainital